Memphis Mercury was an American women's soccer team, founded in 2005. The team was a member of the Women's Premier Soccer League, the third tier of women’s soccer in the United States and Canada, until 2006, when the team left the league and the franchise was terminated.

The team played its home games at Mike Rose Soccer Complex in Memphis, Tennessee.  

The team's colors were blue and white.

Year-by-year

   

Women's Premier Soccer League teams
Women's soccer clubs in the United States
Soccer clubs in Tennessee
2005 establishments in Tennessee
2006 disestablishments in Tennessee
Association football clubs established in 2005
Association football clubs disestablished in 2006